"Yaari Hai" is a song by Tony Kakkar. It was released as a single on 3 August 2019 by Desi Music Factory.

The song received over 100 million views on YouTube in November 2019. The song features Riyaz Aly, Siddharth Nigam and Jaikant Bhardwaj.

As of August 2021, the song has over 300 million views.

References

External links 
 
 Yaari Hai on Gaana
 

2019 singles
Tony Kakkar songs
Hindi songs
2019 songs